Schistura khugae is a species of ray-finned fish in the stone loach genus Schistura. It lives on the bottom of hill streams in the Khuga River, part of the Chindwin River system in Manipur, India.

References

K
Fish described in 2004